Celestyal Journey is a cruise ship completed in 1994 and previously sailed for Holland America Line as Ryndam. It was planned that she would sail for Cruise & Maritime Voyages as Ida Pfeiffer from 2021, but that never happened. P&O subsequently sold her to Seajets in 2020, and in 2023 to Celestyal.

Construction and career

MS Ryndam 
Aegean Goddess previously served as Ryndam from 1994 to 2015, where she served as a member of Holland America Line's , otherwise known as S class. She was ordered in November 1989 alongside two sister ships of her class, and was designated hull number 5883. Her keel was laid by Fincantieri in 1993. From 1993 to 1994, the ship was completed and underwent sea trials. In 1994, Ryndam was christened by Madeleine Arison, and she embarked on her maiden voyage. In 2006, Ryndam underwent dry dock renovations at Grand Bahama Shipyard in Freeport, Grand Bahama.

From January through March 2007, the cruise ship suffered three outbreaks of norovirus and was forced to return to San Diego, California. 355 passengers and 47 crew became sick on the three voyages. After the third outbreak, the vessel underwent a three-day disinfectant servicing before returning to cruise operations. In February 2008, Ryndam returned to San Diego from a ten-day tour with 113 passengers and 8 crew sickened from a norovirus outbreak.

In November 2010, an intoxicated passenger released Ryndams stern anchor while the ship was in international waters en route to Florida. No damage to the ship was reported. In 2010, Ryndam once again underwent dry dock renovations at Grand Bahama Shipyard in Freeport, Grand Bahama.

On 20 May 2014, Holland America Line announced the transfer of Ryndam to P&O Cruises Australia.

In April 2015, two passengers on board Ryndam were found deceased in their stateroom in what appeared to be a murder-suicide. According to Holland America Line, "The cabin was immediately secured and the authorities, including the FBI, were notified." As of now, the formal cause of death associated with the incident remains unclear. In July 2015, Ryndam had to terminate a sailing early due to an outbreak of norovirus. She was sailing a 14-day itinerary, which featured ports of call in Iceland and Norway. She underwent a deep clean in the Port of Harwich immediately afterwards, and returned to service shortly thereafter.

Pacific Aria
After concluding her final season with Holland America Line, Ryndam sailed to Singapore for dry dock at Sembcorp Marine Admiralty Yard. From 31 October to 12 November 2015, Ryndam underwent extensive interior and exterior changes, emerging as the new Pacific Aria. In an attempt to garner global social media recognition for the introduction of two new flagships, P&O Cruises Australia broadcast the ships' christening ceremony on Twitter and through their godmothers' social media accounts. On 25 November, Pacific Aria and her sister, Pacific Eden, were renamed at a ceremony held in Port Jackson, Sydney. Jessica Mauboy served as the godmother for Pacific Aria. It was announces that Pacific Aria would leave the fleet in May 2021, but she was already retired in 2020 because of the COVID-19 pandemic.

Ida Pfeiffer 
In November 2019, P&O Cruises Australia announced the sale of Pacific Aria to Cruise & Maritime Voyages to beginning in May 2021 as Ida Pfeiffer, in honour of the famous Austrian explorer. The two lines agreed to a formal transfer of ownership in Singapore on 2 May 2021, followed by an extensive renovation, including an increase in beds, in order to prepare her for sailing for Cruise & Maritime Voyage's TransOcean Tours brand. However, on 20 July 2020 CMV was placed in administration and subsequently shut down operations.

Aegean Goddess 
In 2020 Pacific Aria was sold to Seajets, and renamed Aegean Goddess. On 12 May 2022 a Greek crewmember was found dead on the ship, laid up in Heraklion.

Celestyal Journey 
In 2023 the ship was sold to Celestyal Cruises and renamed Celestyal Journey. The ship will undergo an extensive $21 million refurbishment and technical maintenance overhaul before entering service.

References

External links

 P&O Cruises Australia official site

 

Ships of Seajets
Ships of the Holland America Line
Ships of P&O Cruises Australia
Ships built by Fincantieri
Ships built in Monfalcone
Maritime incidents in 1994
Maritime incidents in 2007
Maritime incidents in 2010
1993 ships